William A. Fields (between c. 1846 and 1852 – September 9, 1898) was an American schoolteacher and principal who served one term as a Republican legislator in the Tennessee House of Representatives from 1885 to 1886. He was also elected a member of the Shelby County county court (a legislative body) and a justice of the peace. He was born an enslaved person, a (slave).  According to researchers on the American documentary series Who Do You Think You Are? (2011), he is the paternal great-great-grandfather of actress, singer and Miss America 1984, Vanessa Williams and of actor Chris Williams and the maternal great-great-great-grandfather of Jillian Hervey.

See also
African-American officeholders during and following the Reconstruction era

Notes

References

Republican Party members of the Tennessee House of Representatives
African-American state legislators in Tennessee
1898 deaths
Year of birth uncertain
American school administrators
Schoolteachers from Tennessee
County commissioners in Tennessee
People from Shelby County, Tennessee
19th-century American slaves
Vanessa Williams
American freedmen